Franz Hitz (17 July 1828 – 20 November 1891) was a Swiss pianist and composer who lived and worked in France. He was primarily known for his many piano compositions which were much in vogue as salon music in the latter half of the 19th century.

Life and career
Hitz was born in Aarau, Switzerland, but later settled in Honfleur, a port town in northwestern France. He studied at the Paris Conservatoire — piano with Pierre Zimmermann and Adolphe Laurent and harmony with Henri Reber — and began publishing compositions in his early 20s. One of his earliest published works was a quadrille, Les Chapeaux de chez nous (The hats from home). The frontispiece had an engraving by the artist Louis Alexandre Dubourg, a friend of Hitz and a fellow resident of Honfleur. Another early work was the patriotic anthem Retour de l'aigle (The return of the eagle) commemorating the return of Prince Louis-Napoléon Bonaparte to France. In addition to his numerous piano works, his other compositions included a mass with organ accompaniment and several stage works. In 1870  L'Orphéon published his elementary textbook for piano students, Questionnaire musical: Notions élémentaires.

Franz Hitz died at Honfleur at the age of 63 and was buried in the cemetery there. The following year Le Ménestrel announced that a committee had been formed to raise money for the construction of a small mausoleum for his grave. Several of Hitz's compositions continued to be re-published into the 1920s, with some of his solo piano works such as Légende bretonne and Bonne nuit also arranged for orchestra by other composers.

Compositions
Solo piano (selection)

Hitz's more than 200 compositions for solo piano include:
 Bonjour, Op. 146
 Pastorale in C, Op. 174
 Dans les blés, Op. 199
 Caprice - Bonne nuit, Op. 200
 Danse des Guarany, Op. 232
 Causerie, Op. 236
 Idylle - Le Grain de Blé, Op. 484

Stage works
 Le Rouet de Madeleine – opéra comique in 1 act, premiered in Le Havre, 1870
 Les Déesses du Battoir – operetta in 1 act to a libretto by Georges Chauvin, premiered at the Fantaisies Oller in Paris on 22 April 1877 
 Le violon de Crémone – opera in 3 acts to a libretto by Georges Chauvin and Alfred Lecomte based on stories by E. T. A. Hoffmann, composed 1878
 Sous bois – operetta in 1 act to a libretto by Georges Chauvin published circa 1882

References

External links
 Piano scores by Franz Hitz at the International Music Score Library Project (scores are in PDF format)
 Piano scores by Franz Hitz at the Biblioteca Digital del Patrimonio Iberoamericano (scores are in PDF format)
 Piano/vocal score of Hitz's operetta Les déesses du battoir at the Biblioteca Nacional de España (score is in PDF format)

1828 births
1891 deaths
19th-century classical composers
19th-century male musicians
Composers for piano
Conservatoire de Paris alumni
Swiss classical composers
Swiss emigrants to France
Swiss male classical composers
Swiss opera composers
People from Aarau